{{DISPLAYTITLE:C22H25N3O4}}
The molecular formula C22H25N3O4 (molar mass: 395.452 g/mol, exact mass: 395.1845 u) may refer to:

 Abanoquil
 Spirotryprostatin A
 Vesnarinone

Molecular formulas